Yeddioymaq, Masally may refer to:
Birinci Yeddioymaq
İkinci Yeddioymaq